Forte de Santa Catarina is a fort located in Cabedelo, Paraíba in Brazil.

See also
Military history of Brazil

References

External links

Santa Catarina
Buildings and structures in Paraíba
Portuguese colonial architecture in Brazil